The 1916 South Shields by-election was a parliamentary by-election held for the House of Commons constituency of South Shields on 18 March 1916.

Vacancy
The by-election was caused by the death of the sitting Liberal Member of Parliament (MP) Russell Rea who had held the seat since himself winning it in a by-election on 27 October 1910.

Candidates
The Liberals selected Cecil Cochrane a 46-year-old ironmaster from Middlesbrough as their candidate. Cochrane had contested Durham for the Liberals at the December 1910 general election. In view of the wartime truce between the parties, neither the Unionists nor the Labour Party put forward candidates and there were no Independent candidates either.

The result
Cochrane was returned unopposed.

References

See also
List of United Kingdom by-elections
United Kingdom by-election records
1918 South Shields by-election

Unopposed by-elections to the Parliament of the United Kingdom in English constituencies
1916 elections in the United Kingdom
1916 in England
20th century in County Durham
March 1916 events
South Shields by-elections